"Let Me Think About It" is a song performed by Danish soul singer Ida Corr and Dutch house DJ Fedde le Grand. It is a remix by le Grand of Corr's original track which appeared on her 2006 album Robosoul. The song features credited vocals by Corr and uncredited vocals by Danish R&B singer Burhan G.

Production 
In 2006 Ida Corr, Christian von Staffeldt aka Motrack and Burhan Genc wrote the track for Ida Corr's second album Robosoul. Corr, Motrack and Kasper Tranberg produced the original album version of the song. soul version album.

In 2007 Fedde Le Grand heard the album version through Ida's label Lifted House. He then produced a remix of the song and released it through his label Flamingo Recordings.

The remix has an electro and house feel, with a 'jerky' beat and also with an element of jazz. The original song uses less drums and has an acoustic-urban feel.

Critical reception
Alex Fletcher of Digital Spy gave the song four out of five stars, and wrote: "Fedde has teamed up with Ida Corr to produce another three minutes of thunderous dance-tastic frivolities. 'Let Me Think About It' couldn't possibly be any more of an Ibiza TUNE. It's the sound of Pete Tong, Dave Pearce and Scott Mills stood screaming with a load of Club 18-30 reps, while some boozed-up bikini-clad temptress grinds up against you all soaked up into a CD package. Packed with parping horns, cascading synth beats and the sound of a fire alarm being played along to the theme from Shaft".

Music video
In summer 2007 director Marcus Adams shot the music video for the remix in London. The video features Ida Corr with an afro hairdo and the dancers Anchelique Mariano, Dominique Tipper and Stephanie Fitzpatrick, dressed in a similar manner dancing and feigning to play various instruments. Dancer Jason Beitel, who mimes to Burhan G's voice, is the male protagonist of the clip. Natricia Bernard did the choreography.

Chart performance
The song is the third Danish single of Ida Corr's album Robosoul and the third single from Fedde le Grand, released in the United Kingdom, following the number-one hit "Put Your Hands Up 4 Detroit", and the well-received collaboration with Danish singer Camille Jones, "The Creeps". "Let Me Think About It" became the most successful single for both artists. The single reached number two on the UK Singles Chart on 7 October 2007 and stayed there for one more week. In Australia, it peaked at number 14 on the Australian ARIA Singles Chart, and in New Zealand, it reached number 12.

In the United States it was released by Ida Corr (but listed as "Ida Corr vs. Fedde le Grand") and reached number one on Billboard's Hot Dance Airplay chart on 9 February 2008, making it the first import single to reach the chart, until the week ending 1 March, when Ministry Of Sound America picked up the single for a US commercial release. In Germany, the single peaked at number 14 on the German Single Charts. In 2008 it stayed over 40 weeks within the Top 100, which resulted in the longest stay for a single in the German Top 100 in 2008.

Track listing

Danish single
 Let Me Think About It (Fedde Le Grand Club Mix) 6:05
 Let Me Think About It (Fedde Le Grand Radio Edit) 2:35
 Let Me Think About It (Funkerman Remix)
 Let Me Think About It (Gregor Salto & DJ Madskilz Remix)
 Let Me Think About It (MBK Extended Mix)
 Let Me Think About It (MBK Remix Radio Edit)
 Let Me Think About It (Sidelmann Remix)
 Let Me Think About It (Original Album Version) 3:45

Danish remix single
 Let Me Think About It (Fedde Le Grand Radio Edit) 2:30
 Let Me Think About It (Fedde Le Grand Club Mix) 5:45
 Let Me Think About It (MBK Remix Radio Edit)
 Let Me Think About It (MBK Extended Mix)
 Let Me Think About It (Micky Slim Remix)
 Let Me Think About It (Eddie Thoneick Remix)
 Let Me Think About It (Funkerman Remix)
 Let Me Think About It (Gregor Salto & DJ Madskilz Remix)
 Let Me Think About It (James Talk Remix)
 Let Me Think About It (Jason Herd's Jfunk Remix)
 Let Me Think About It (Sidelmann Remix)
 Let Me Think About It (Original Album Version) 3:40

Australian single
 Let Me Think About It (Fedde Le Grand Radio Edit) 2:35
 Let Me Think About It (Fedde Le Grand Club Mix) 6:05
 Let Me Think About It (Instrumental) 2:45
 Let Me Think About It (Eddie Thoneick Remix)
 Let Me Think About It (Jason Herd's Jfunk Remix)

German single
 Let Me Think About It (Fedde Le Grand Radio Edit) 2:30
 Let Me Think About It (Fedde Le Grand Club Mix) 5:45
 Let Me Think About It (Gregor Salto & DJ Madskilz Remix)
 Let Me Think About It (Jason Herd's Jfunk Remix)
 Let Me Think About It (Eddie Thoneick Remix)
 Let Me Think About It (Instrumental) 2:45
 Let Me Think About It (Music Video) 6:05

U.S. digital download
 Let Me Think About It (Fedde Le Grand Radio Edit) 2:35
 Let Me Think About It (Robbie Rivera Juicy Miami Mix)
 Let Me Think About It (Eddie Thoneick Remix)
 Let Me Think About It (Jason Herd's Jfunk Remix)

U.S. remix digital download
 Let Me Think About It (Fedde Le Grand Club Mix) 6:05
 Let Me Think About It (Funkerman Remix)
 Let Me Think About It (Micky Slim Remix)
 Let Me Think About It (James Talk Remix)
 Let Me Think About It (Sidelmann Remix)

'''U.K. & U.S.A. Singles
Let Me Think About It (Extended Club Mix) 6:05

Personnel
 Ida Corr – songwriting, production, vocals
 MoTrack (Christian von Staffeldt) – songwriting, production, additional instruments
 Burhan Genc – songwriting, vocals
 Kasper Tranberg – trumpet

Source:

Charts and certifications

Charts

Year-end charts

Certifications

Awards and nominations
"Let Me Think About It" has been certified a Platinum Award for more than 15,000 sold singles by IFPI in Denmark and with an award for more than 10,000 plays in UK by Nielsen Music Control Airplay Awards Notification UK. The single also won two Danish DeeJay Awards in 2008 for "Best Danish Deejay Favorite" and "Best Danish Dancehit". In 2008 the song has been certified an IMPALA Diamond Award for selling more than 250,000 units (CDs, Downloads, Albumtrack) in the European countries.

References 

2007 singles
2008 singles
Fedde le Grand songs
House music songs
Ministry of Sound singles
2007 songs